Hellinsia aegyptiacus is a moth of the family Pterophoridae. It is known from Egypt.

References

aegyptiacus
Moths of Africa
Endemic fauna of Egypt
Moths described in 1914